Leonardo Sierra Monteiro (born February 3, 1987) is a Brazilian actor, engineer and entrepreneur.

Career 
Monteiro was known nationally as an actor when he was a child, making his debut in Brazilian version of Disney Club in 1997, which later became Disney CRUJ and in 2013 started a startup of price intelligence in physical retail called InfoPrice, that in 2015 part has acquired by B2W an online retail company in Latin America.

References

External links 
 

1987 births
Living people
Male actors from São Paulo
Brazilian people of Spanish descent
Brazilian businesspeople
Brazilian male child actors